"Jealousy" is a song originally written in 1982 by English synth-pop duo Pet Shop Boys, recorded for their fourth studio album, Behaviour (1990). It was released on 27 May 1991 as the album's fourth and final single in a slightly remixed form, which appears on both Pet Shop Boys' greatest hits albums. It has also been covered by British band Dubstar, and was performed by Robbie Williams at the Pet Shop Boys' 2006 BBC Radio 2 concert at the Mermaid Theatre, a recording of which was released on the Pet Shop Boys' live album Concrete.

Background
In the Further Listening 1990–1991 booklet (enclosed with the 2001 two-CD re-release of Behaviour), Neil Tennant states that "Jealousy" is the first proper song ever composed by the duo. Chris Lowe composed the melody at the piano in his parents' home and, as he felt it should be a ballad, asked Tennant to write an intense-sounding lyric. Tennant complied by writing a lyric about the simplest form of jealousy: infidelity suspicions aroused by someone's indifferent or disrespectful attitudes towards another person's feelings (such as making his/her partner wait all night for a phone call which never comes). The song was then left off three albums because the duo were waiting for legendary film composer Ennio Morricone to agree to score the orchestral arrangement for the song. Morricone's answer never came, and Harold Faltermeyer ended up doing the arrangement for the song's release on Behaviour.

Versions
The album version, coming at the end of Behaviour, closed off the album with a sampler-based orchestral outro. The single version is slightly remixed, and uses a real orchestra instead during the outro. The extended version of the single version lengthens the outro while adding an orchestral intro as well; in addition, Neil Tennant recites a quote from William Shakespeare's Othello (Act III, Scene III) over both sequences:Not poppy, nor mandragora,
Nor all the drowsy syrups of the world,
Shall ever medicine thee to that sweet sleep
Which thou owedst yesterday.

The extended version is also the arrangement performed live with Robbie Williams.

Dubstar's version, recorded for a covers album produced for EMI's centennial anniversary, is more sparsely arranged and comes to a full stop, with no additional instrumentation, with the last word of the lyrics.

"Jealousy" is also one of the songs covered on Goes Petshopping, the debut album by Pet Shop Boys tribute band West End Girls.

B-side
"Losing My Mind", taken from the Stephen Sondheim musical Follies, was based on a demo originally recorded as a proposal for the Liza Minnelli album Results. Its release here follows the releases of Minnelli's version on both Results and as the lead single from the album. As with the A-side, "Losing My Mind" was released in an extended mix (the "Disco mix") on the 12-inch single. The Disco Mix of "Losing My Mind" also appears on the 2001 re-release of Introspective, which implies it was recorded between 1988 and 1989.

Critical reception
Pan-European magazine Music & Media wrote, "Introducing Neil Tennant in a new role as balladeer. Different but still 'pet sounds' as usual." Barbara Ellen, writing for NME, described "Jealousy" as "a romantic ballad with a subtext viciously outlining the darker side of love". She added, "It flows along beautifully, made all the better for Tennant sounding less sure than usual, more open to the soul that shrieks inside."

Track listings

 7-inch: Parlophone / R 6283 (UK)
 "Jealousy" (7-inch version) – 4:16
 "Losing My Mind" (7-inch version) – 4:34

 CD: Parlophone / CD R 6283 (UK)
 "Jealousy" (7-inch version) – 4:16
 "Losing My Mind" (Disco Mix) – 6:07
 "Jealousy" (Extended Mix) – 7:54

 CD: Parlophone / 20 4224 2 (UK)
 "Jealousy" (7-inch version) – 4:16
 "Losing My Mind" (7-inch version) – 4:34
 "Losing My Mind" (Disco Mix) – 6:07

 CD: Parlophone / CDRS 6283 (UK)
 "Jealousy" (Extended Mix) – 7:54
 "This Must Be the Place I Waited Years to Leave" (Extended Mix) – 7:24
 "So Hard" (Eclipse Mix) – 4:02
 Limited edition in digipak

 12-inch: Parlophone / 12 R 6283 (UK)
 "Jealousy" (Extended Mix) – 7:54
 "Losing My Mind" (Disco Mix) – 6:08

Charts

References

1982 songs
1991 singles
Parlophone singles
Pet Shop Boys songs
Song recordings produced by Harold Faltermeyer
Songs written by Chris Lowe
Songs written by Neil Tennant